Cameron Robert Carter-Vickers (born December 31, 1997) is an American professional soccer player who plays as a center-back for Scottish Premiership club Celtic and the United States national team.

Carter-Vickers began his career at the Tottenham Hotspur Academy. He made his debut in the 2016–17 season, playing in cup competitions. He spent time out on loan at Championship clubs Sheffield United, Ipswich Town, Swansea City, Stoke City, Luton Town, and Bournemouth. After winning the Scottish Premiership and Scottish League Cup on loan, he joined Celtic in 2022.

Club career

Tottenham Hotspur
Carter-Vickers joined the academy at Tottenham Hotspur at age 11, having caught the eyes of scouts as a 10-year-old playing in the youth teams at Catholic United.

He was fast tracked through the academy, and under manager Mauricio Pochettino he made his first match-day squad against Ligue 1 team AS Monaco in the UEFA Europa League on December 10, 2015. Carter-Vickers featured in the 2016 International Champions Cup, making starts against Juventus and Atlético Madrid, and was given the jersey number 38 for the 2016–17 season. On September 21, 2016, he made his first-team debut for the club in the third round of the EFL Cup against Gillingham, which Spurs won 5–0. He also featured in the next round away at Liverpool, which Spurs lost 2–1. He played two FA Cup matches in January 2017, firstly against Aston Villa then Wycombe Wanderers.

Loans
Carter-Vickers signed a season-long loan deal with newly promoted Championship side Sheffield United on August 25, 2017. On his debut and his first career league game, Carter-Vickers scored the only goal of the game, a 33rd-minute winner against Bolton Wanderers. After playing 18 games for Sheffield United and scoring one goal, Carter-Vickers was recalled and returned to Tottenham on January 15, 2018.

On January 19, 2018, Ipswich Town signed Carter-Vickers on loan until the end of the season. He made his Ipswich Town debut away to Bolton Wanderers on January 20, 2018. Carter-Vickers played 17 times for the Tractor Boys as they finished in a mid-table position of 12th.

Swansea City signed Carter-Vickers on loan until the end of the season on August 25, 2018. At Swansea, he formed a partnership alongside Mike van der Hoorn at center-back after the injury to first choice Joe Rodon. In total, he made 33 appearances in all competitions for Swansea, impressing partially due to his passing ability from the center-back position.

On August 8, 2019, Carter-Vickers joined Stoke City on loan for the 2019–20 season. He made 15 appearances before he was recalled by Spurs on January 2, 2020, and then sent on a six-month loan to Luton Town four weeks later. Due to the season being extended by the COVID-19 outbreak, Carter-Vickers' loan to Luton was extended till the end of the campaign.

Carter-Vickers joined Championship side AFC Bournemouth on a season-long loan on October 16, 2020. He scored his first goal for Bournemouth in a 2–1 win at Bristol City on March 3, 2021.

Return to Tottenham
On August 19, 2021, Carter-Vickers received his first Tottenham appearance since 2017, starting under new manager Nuno Espírito Santo in the club's first-ever UEFA Europa Conference League match, a 1–0 loss away at Paços de Ferreira.

Celtic 
On August 31, 2021, Carter-Vickers joined Scottish Premiership side Celtic on loan until the end of the 2021–22 season. He scored on his debut with a deflected strike from outside the box in a 3–0 victory over Ross County on September 13. 

On April 3, 2022, Carter-Vickers scored the winning goal in a 2–1 win against Rangers at Ibrox Stadium. This moved Celtic six points clear of their rivals at the top of the Premiership table.

He played 45 games in all competitions as the team won the Scottish League Cup and the Premiership, with Celtic holding the best defensive record in the latter.

On June 10, 2022, Carter-Vickers signed with Celtic permanently, effective from July 1. The transfer was on a four-year deal for an undisclosed fee, reported to be around £6 million.

International career

Youth
In the summer of 2014, Carter-Vickers was playing for Tottenham's academy side at the IMG Cup in Bradenton, Florida, where they beat the United States under-17 team 5–3. During the game, he caught the eye of American coaches who had learned of his eligibility for a United States passport, as his father is an American citizen.

Carter-Vickers represented the United States for the first time at under-18 level in August 2014 and by October of that year was a member of the United States under-23 team. He represented the United States at the 2015 FIFA U-20 World Cup and started several games despite being only 17 at the time. The team were knocked out by Serbia in the quarter finals.

In September 2016, it was reported that the English FA had made inquiries about Carter-Vickers and that the United States were prepared to fast track the player into their senior set up. On October 10, 2016, Carter-Vickers captained the United States under-20 team in a 2–0 loss against England.

Senior
On November 6, 2016, Carter-Vickers received his first call up to the senior United States squad. He made his senior debut appearance on November 14, 2017, in a friendly as a half-time substitute in a 1–1 draw away to Portugal.

In May 2022, coach Gregg Berhalter recalled Carter-Vickers after nearly three years without a cap. He was called up for the 2022 FIFA World Cup in November and made his World Cup debut on November 29 against Iran.

Style of play
Carter-Vickers is known as a ball playing center-back with accurate passing ability. His athleticism and strength are some of his best qualities as a defender, his teammate at Celtic, Carl Starfelt, spoke about Carter Vickers stating, "Cameron is the strongest in the team - but he is never in the gym…
I think he's just super-strong genetically as he is never in the gym."

Personal life
Carter-Vickers' father is Howard Carter, an American basketball player who spent his professional career in the NBA and Europe and became a French citizen. His English mother, Geraldine Vickers from Essex, met Carter while both were working in Greece. He was raised in Essex and attended The Eastwood Academy in Leigh-on-Sea, while spending summers with his father in Louisiana.

Career statistics

Club

International

Honors
Celtic
Scottish Premiership: 2021–22
Scottish League Cup: 2021–22, 2022–23

United States U20
CONCACAF U-20 Championship: third place 2015

Individual
PFA Scotland Team of the Year (Premiership): 2021–22

References

External links

 
 

1997 births
Living people
Sportspeople from Southend-on-Sea
Black British sportsmen
English people of American descent
English people of African-American descent
English people of French descent
Citizens of the United States through descent
English footballers
African-American soccer players
American soccer players
Association football central defenders
Tottenham Hotspur F.C. players
Sheffield United F.C. players
Ipswich Town F.C. players
Swansea City A.F.C. players
Stoke City F.C. players
AFC Bournemouth players
Celtic F.C. players
English Football League players
United States men's youth international soccer players
United States men's under-20 international soccer players
United States men's under-23 international soccer players
United States men's international soccer players
2015 CONCACAF U-20 Championship players
2022 FIFA World Cup players
21st-century African-American sportspeople